The Yankee River is a river in Stewart Island / Rakiura, New Zealand, flowing into Foveaux Strait.

See also
List of rivers of New Zealand

References

Rivers of Stewart Island